The imperial election of 1745 was an imperial election held to select the emperor of the Holy Roman Empire. It took place in Frankfurt on September 13.

Background

War of the Austrian Succession 

Charles VI, Holy Roman Emperor died on October 20, 1740.  His daughter Maria Theresa inherited his royal titles in Austria, Hungary, Croatia, Bohemia, Transylvania, Mantua, Milan, Galicia and Lodomeria, the Austrian Netherlands and Parma according to the terms of the Pragmatic Sanction of 1713.

Although Prussia had accepted the Pragmatic Sanction, it now repudiated Maria Theresa's inheritance as a violation of Salic law.  Its king Frederick the Great invaded Silesia on December 16.  France and Bavaria, whose elector Charles Albert rejected the Pragmatic Sanction for self-interested reasons, joined Prussia in 1741. Charles Albert's territories in Bavaria were quickly overrun by the Austrian forces of Maria Theresa, but the alliance remained on the attack. On November 26, Prague was captured and on December 9, Charles Albert crowned himself king of Bohemia.  On January 24, 1742, in the imperial election of 1742, from which Maria Theresa was excluded, he was elected Holy Roman Emperor as Charles VII.

He died of gout at Nymphenburg Palace on January 20, 1745, three years before the conclusion of the war.

Election of 1745 
The electors called to Frankfurt to choose Charles VII's successor were:

 Johann Friedrich Karl von Ostein, elector of Mainz
 Franz Georg von Schönborn, elector of Trier
 Clemens August, elector of Cologne
 Maria Theresa, queen regnant of Bohemia
 Maximilian III Joseph, elector of Bavaria
 Augustus III of Poland, elector of Saxony
 Frederick the Great, elector of Brandenburg
 Charles Theodore, elector of the Palatinate
 George II of Great Britain, elector of Brunswick-Lüneburg

Maria Theresa came to an arrangement with Maximilian III Joseph, Charles VII's son, wherein she would allow his return to Bavaria in exchange for his support, and the support of his uncle Clemens August, of the candidacy of her husband, Francis of Lorraine.

Elected 
Francis was elected Emperor Francis I with the support of seven of the electors. Frederick the Great and Charles Theodore, opponents of Maria Theresa in the War of the Austrian Succession, abstained.

References 

1745
1745 in the Holy Roman Empire
18th-century elections in Europe
Non-partisan elections
Francis I, Holy Roman Emperor